Ponte Vecchio (Italian: Old Bridge) may refer to:

Bridges
 Ponte Vecchio, a Medieval bridge over the Arno River, in Florence, Italy
 Ponte Vecchio, Bassano, or Ponte degli Alpini, a sixteenth-century bridge over the river Brenta in Bassano del Grappa, Italy
 Ponte Vecchio, Cesena, or Ponte Clemente, an eighteenth-century bridge over the River Savio in Cesena, Italy
 Ponte Vecchio, Ivrea, a stone and brick arch bridge over the Dora Baltea in Ivrea, Italy
 Ponte Coperto, a brick and stone arch bridge over the Ticino River in Pavia, Italy

Other
Ponte Vecchio, the code product name for a data center HPC version of the Intel Xe graphics processing unit

See also 
 Old Bridge (disambiguation)